Floyd's Station was a fort on Beargrass Creek in what is now St. Matthews, Kentucky. In November 1779 James John Floyd built cabins and a stockade near what is now Breckenridge Lane. In 1783, John Floyd, future Governor of Virginia was born in the Station. The pioneer's father was killed by Indians twelve days before the birth of his son. The station was one of six on Beargrass Creek and was involved in local conflict with Native Americans in the area for the next five years. All that remain today of Floyd's Station are a spring house and cemetery.

Approximate location:

Gallery

See also

Corn Island (Kentucky)
Fort Nelson (Kentucky)
Fort-on-Shore
Fort William (Kentucky)
Spring Station (Kentucky)
Low Dutch Station
Bryan's Station
Station (frontier defensive structure)

References

Further reading 

Forts in Kentucky
Buildings and structures in Jefferson County, Kentucky
Pre-statehood history of Kentucky
St. Matthews, Kentucky
1779 establishments in Virginia